Megumi Yokoyama may refer to:

, Japanese actress
, Japanese badminton player